Koytur may refer to:
Koytur, Armenia
Koytur, Iran